An environmentalist is a person who is concerned with and/or advocates for the protection of the environment. An environmentalist can be considered a supporter of the goals of the environmental movement, "a political and ethical movement that seeks to improve and protect the quality of the natural environment through changes to environmentally harmful human activities". An environmentalist is engaged in or believes in the philosophy of environmentalism or one of the related philosophies. 

The environmental movement has a number of subcommunities, with different approaches and focuses – each developing distinct movements and identities. Environmentalists are sometimes referred to by critics with informal or derogatory terms such as "greenie" and "tree-hugger", with some members of the public associating the most radical environmentalists with these derogatory terms.

Types 
The environmental movement contains a number of subcommunities, that have developed with different approaches and philosophies in different parts of the world. Notably, the early environmental movement experienced a deep tension between the philosophies of conservation and broader environmental protection. In recent decades the rise to prominence of environmental justice, indigenous rights and key environmental crises like the climate crises, has led to the development of other environmentalist identities. Environmentalists can be describe as one of the following:

Climate activists 
The public recognition of the climate crisis and emergence of the climate movement in the beginning of the 21st century led to a distinct group of activists. Activations like the School Strike for Climate and Fridays for Future, have led to a new generation of youth activists like Greta Thunberg, Jamie Margolin and Vanessa Nakate who have created a global youth climate movement.

Conservationists 
One notable strain of environmentalism, comes from the philosophy of the conservation movement. Conservationists are concerned with leaving the environment in a better state than the condition they found it distinct from human interaction. The conservation movement is associated with the early parts of the environmental movement of the 19th and 20th century.

Environmental defenders

Greens 

The adoption of environmentalist into a distinct political ideology led to the development of political parties called "green parties", typically with a leftist political approach to overlapping issues of environmental and social wellbeing.

Water protectors

Notable environmentalists 

Some of the notable environmentalists who have been active in lobbying for environmental protection and conservation include:
Edward Abbey (writer, activist, philosopher)
 Ansel Adams (photographer, writer, activist)
Bayarjargal Agvaantseren (Mongolian conservationist)
 Qazi Kholiquzzaman Ahmad (environmental activist and economist of Bangladesh)
 David Attenborough (broadcaster, naturalist)
John James Audubon (naturalist)
 Sundarlal Bahuguna (environmentalist)
 Seyyed Hossein Nasr (writer, philosopher)
 Vic Barrett (climate activist)
 Patriarch Bartholomew I (priest)
 David Bellamy (botanist)
Ng Cho-nam (Hong Kong environmentalist and Associate Professor of Geography at University of Hong Kong)
 Thomas Berry (priest, historian, philosopher)
 Wendell Berry (farmer, philosopher)
 Chandi Prasad Bhatt (Gandhian environmentalist)
 Murray Bookchin (anarchist, philosopher, social ecologist)
 Wendy Bowman, Australian environmental activist
 Stewart Brand (writer, founder of Whole Earth Catalog)
 David Brower (writer, activist)
 Molly Burhans (cartographer, activist)
 Tahir Qureshi Mangrove Man or Mangroves Hero of Pakistan. Pakistani environmentalist.
 Lester Brown (environmentalist)
 Kevin Buzzacott (Aboriginal activist)
 Michelle Dilhara (actress)
 Helen Caldicott (medical doctor)
 Joan Carling (Filipino human rights defender) 
 Rachel Carson (biologist, writer)
 Charles III (King of the Commonwealth Realms)
 Chevy Chase (comedian)
 Barry Commoner (biologist, politician)
 Mike Cooley (engineer, trade unionist)
 Jacques-Yves Cousteau (explorer, ecologist)
 Faiza Darkhani (c. 1992), Afghani environmentalist, women's rights activist, and educator
 John Denver (musician)
 Leonardo DiCaprio (actor)
 René Dubos (microbiologist)
 Paul R. Ehrlich (population biologist)
 Hans-Josef Fell (German Green Party member)
 Jane Fonda (actor)
 Rolf Gardiner (rural revivalist)
 Peter Garrett (musician, politician)
 Al Gore (politician, former Vice President of the United States)
Tom Hanks (actor)
 James Hansen (scientist)
 Denis Hayes (environmentalist and solar power advocate)
 Nicolas Hulot (journalist and writer)
 Robert Hunter (journalist, co-founder and first president of Greenpeace)
 Tetsunari Iida (sustainable energy advocate)
 Jorian Jenks (English farmer)
 Kathy Jetn̄il-Kijiner (poet and climate activist)
 Naomi Klein (writer, activist)
 Winona LaDuke (environmentalist)
A. Carl Leopold (plant physiologist)
 Aldo Leopold (ecologist)
 Charles Lindbergh (aviator)
 James Lovelock (scientist)
 Amory Lovins (energy policy analyst)
 Hunter Lovins (environmentalist)
 Mark Lynas (journalist, activist)
 Desmond Majekodunmi (environmentalist)
 Xiuhtezcatl Martinez (activist)
 Peter Max (graphic designer)
 Michael McCarthy (naturalist, newspaper journalist, newspaper columnist, and author)
 Bill McKibben (writer, activist)
 David McTaggart (activist)
 Mahesh Chandra Mehta (lawyer, environmentalist)
 Chico Mendes (activist)
 George Monbiot (journalist)
 Sergio Rossetti Morosini (naturalist, activist)
 John Muir (naturalist, activist)
 Luke Mullen (actor, filmmaker, environmentalist/activist)
 Hilda Murrell (botanist, activist)
 Ralph Nader (activist)
 Gaylord Nelson (politician)
 Yolanda Ortiz (chemist), Argentine environmentalist
 Eugene Pandala (architect, environmentalist, natural and cultural heritage conservator)
 Medha Patkar (activist)
 Alan Pears (environmental consultant and energy efficiency pioneer)
 River Phoenix (actor, musician, activist)
 Jonathon Porritt (politician)
 Phil Radford (environmental, clean energy and democracy advocate, Greenpeace Executive Director)
 Bonnie Raitt (musician)
 Theodore Roosevelt (former President of the United States)
 Hakob Sanasaryan (biochemist, activist)
 Ken Saro-Wiwa (writer, television producer, activist)
 Shimon Schwarzschild (writer, activist)
 Vandana Shiva (environmental activist)
 Swami Sundaranand (yogi, photographer, author and mountaineer)
 David Suzuki (scientist, broadcaster)
 Candice Swanepoel (model)
 Shōzō Tanaka (politician and activist)
 Saalumarada Thimmakka
 Henry David Thoreau (writer, philosopher)
 Greta Thunberg (activist)
 Jo Valentine (politician and activist)
 Harvey Wasserman (journalist, activist)
 Paul Watson (activist and lecturer)
 Franz Weber (environmentalist and animal welfare activist)
 Henry Williamson (naturalist, writer)
Wangari Maathai (Kenyan environmentalist, Nobel Laureate)
Vanessa Nakate (Ugandan youth climate justice activist, UN SDG 13 Young Leader)
Nyombi Morris (Ugandan youth environmental activist, CNN Environmentalist of tomorrow)
Yusuf Baluch (Climate Justice Activist)

Extension 
In recent years, there are not only environmentalists for natural environment but also environmentalists for human environment. For instance, the activists who call for "mental green space" by getting rid of disadvantages of internet, cable TV, and smartphones have been called "info-environmentalists".

See also

Environmentalism
 Global 500 Roll of Honour
 Grantham Prize for Excellence in Reporting on the Environment
 Heroes of the Environment
 Tyler Prize for Environmental Achievement
Conservationist
Conservation movement
Conservation ethic
Ecology movement
Goldman Environmental Prize
Green libertarianism
 Ecofascism
Green conservatism
List of peace activists
List of people associated with renewable energy
List of pro-nuclear environmentalists
 Greenpeace
School strike for climate

References

External links

 The Environmentalist - News blog by Greenpeace.

 
 
Political occupations